Battenberg or Battenburg (with either 'cake' or 'square' added on the end) is a light sponge cake with different sections held together with jam. The cake is covered in marzipan and, when cut in cross section, displays a distinctive two-by-two check pattern alternately coloured pink and yellow. The large chequered patterns on emergency vehicles in the UK are officially referred to as Battenburg markings because of their resemblance to the cake. 

Charles Nevin wrote in The Independent: “Battenberg cake is exemplarily British. The first cake was baked in 1884 to celebrate Prince Louis of Battenberg marrying Princess Victoria, Queen Victoria’s granddaughter and Prince Philip’s grandmother.” Early Battenbergs had as many as 25 squares, and food historian Ivan Day states the simplified four-panelled cake occurred when large industrial bakers such as Lyons began producing it.

Recipe 

Bakers construct Battenberg cakes by baking yellow and pink almond sponge-cakes separately, and then cutting and combining the pieces in a chequered pattern. The cake is held together by apricot jam and covered with marzipan.

Origins 

While the cake originates in England, its exact origins are unclear,
with early recipes also using the alternative names "Domino Cake" (recipe by Agnes Bertha Marshall, 1898), "Neapolitan Roll" (recipe by Robert Wells, 1898),
or "Church Window Cake".

The cake was purportedly named in honour of the marriage of Princess Victoria, a granddaughter of Queen Victoria, to Prince Louis of Battenberg in 1884. The name refers to the German town of Battenberg, Hesse, which was the seat of an aristocratic family that died out in the early Middle Ages and whose title was transferred in 1851 to Countess Julia Hauke on behalf of her marriage to Prince Alexander of Hesse and by Rhine; then first Countess of Battenberg, afterwards Princess of Battenberg, known in Britain since 1917 as Mountbatten. Food historian Ivan Day refuted the idea that four panels is reference to four princes or houses as older recipes show higher numbers of panels (Day could neither confirm nor deny name origin in the royal wedding via contemporary sources), and states the simplification of the four-panelled cake occurred when "large industrial bakers such as Lyons" got in on the battenberg game – "I suppose a four-panel battenburg [a common 19th-century spelling] is much easier to make on a production line".

According to The Oxford Companion to Food, the name "Battenberg cake" first appeared in print in 1903. However, a "Battenburg cake" appeared in: Frederick Vine, Saleable Shop Goods for Counter-Tray and Window … (London, England:  Office of the Baker and Confectioner, 1898).

See also 

 List of foods named after people

References 

British cakes
Marzipan
Victorian cuisine
Sponge cakes
Foods with jam